École polytechnique universitaire de Clermont-Auvergne (Polytech Clermont) a French engineering college created in 1969.

The school trains engineers in the six majors : biological engineering, civil engineering, electrical engineering, mathematical engineering and modeling, physics engineering, production systems engineering.

Located in Aubière, close to Clermont-Ferrand, Polytech Clermont is a public higher education institution. The school is a member of the Polytechnic Institute of Clermont-Auvergne.

References

External links
 Polytech Clermont

Engineering universities and colleges in France
Polytech Clermont
Clermont-Ferrand
Educational institutions established in 1969
1969 establishments in France